Doug Novak is an American basketball coach who is currently the associate basketball coach for the Army Black Knights basketball team. Novak was previously the interim head coach of the Mississippi State women's basketball team from 2021 to 2022. He was elevated to interim head coach of Mississippi State following the resignation of Nikki McCray-Penson due to health concerns. Novak has been head coach once before, coaching the Bethel Royals.

College
Novak attended Tennessee University from 1987 to 1990 where he majored in psychology. While at Tennessee, Novak played tennis and was a part of the Tennessee tennis team that was ranked number one at the collegiate level.

Coaching career
After serving as an assistant tennis coach at Clemson University, Novak coached as an assistant for various colleges, most notably The Citadel and Tulane University. Novak was also the head coach at Anderson University and Bethel University. Following an eight-year tenure for Bethel, he became an assistant coach for Mississippi State University women's basketball. He was later elevated to the position of interim head coach following the resignation of Nikki McCray-Penson. Following his season as interim head coach, Novak was hired as the associate head coach for the Army Black Knights men's basketball team.

Head coaching record

References

External links
Mississippi State biography

Living people
Year of birth missing (living people)
American men's basketball coaches
American men's basketball players
Anderson Trojans men's basketball coaches
Basketball coaches from Mississippi
The Citadel Bulldogs basketball coaches
Francis Marion Patriots men's basketball coaches
Iowa Western Reivers men's basketball coaches
Mississippi State Bulldogs women's basketball coaches
Tennessee Volunteers men's tennis players
Tulane Green Wave men's basketball coaches